Erethistoides is a genus of South Asian river catfishes.

Species 
There are currently 10 recognized species in this genus:
 Erethistoides ascita H. H. Ng & Edds, 2005
 Erethistoides cavatura H. H. Ng & Edds, 2005
 Erethistoides infuscatus H. H. Ng, 2006
 Erethistoides longispinis H. H. Ng, Ferraris & Neely, 2012
 Erethistoides luteolus H. H. Ng, Ferraris & Neely, 2012
 Erethistoides montana Hora, 1950
 Erethistoides pipri Hora, 1950
 Erethistoides senkhiensis Tamang, Chaudhry & Choudhury, 2008
 Erethistoides sicula H. H. Ng, 2005
 Erethistoides vesculus H. H. Ng, Ferraris & Neely, 2012

Distribution and habitat
This genus is known from the sub-Himalayan region of the Indian subcontinent. They are found in the Brahmaputra and Meghna drainages, northern India and Nepal.

Description
Erethistoides is distinguished from all other erethistids by having the anterior margin of the pectoral fin spine with serrations directed toward the tip of the spine distally, and away from the tip proximally; however, the use of this as a diagnostic character has been questioned as some specimens of Erethistes filamentosa also show this trait. They also lack a thoracic adhesive apparatus present in some other erethistids, and a smooth to granulate anterior margin on the dorsal fin spine, moderate gill openings that extend to the underside of the fish, a papillate upper lip, and 9–11 anal fin rays. The head is depressed and triangular, and the body is elongate and compressed. The eyes are small to moderate and are placed dorsolaterally in the posterior half of the head. The pectoral fin spine is serrated anteriorly and posteriorly. The dorsal fin spine is serrated posteriorly but not anteriorly.

References

Erethistidae
Fish of South Asia
Catfish genera
Freshwater fish genera
Taxa named by Sunder Lal Hora